Desert Rose is a South African crime thriller television series developed by Quizzical Pictures. Distributed by MultiChoice, the series premiered on M-Net on 2 June 2022.

Cast

Episodes

Production
The series was first announced in August 2021, with Rohan Dickson attached as show runner and Cindy Lee attached as director. The announced cast were Neil Sandilands, Tinarie van Wyk-Loots, Kai Luke Brümmer, Amalia Uys, Christia Visser, Brendon Daniels, Inge Beckmann, Craig Urbani, Tarryn Lamb, Roeline Daneel, and Danny Ross. Other cast members include Daniah de Villiers, Ben Voss, Tracey-Lee Oliver, Melt Sieberhagen, and David Viviers.

References

External links

Desert Rose at M-Net
Desert Rose at MultiChoice

2022 South African television series debuts
2020s South African television series
Crime thriller television series
M-Net original programming